General Charles Lawrence Bolte (May 8, 1895 – February 11, 1989) was a senior United States Army officer who fought in both World War I and World War II. In World War II he distinguished himself as commander of the 34th Infantry Division during the Italian Campaign, for which he was twice awarded the Army Distinguished Service Medal. Later promoted to four-star general officer rank, his final post was Vice Chief of Staff of the United States Army.

Early life and military career
Bolte graduated from what is today the Illinois Institute of Technology with a degree in chemical engineering. He began his military career in 1916, during World War I (although the United States was still officially neutral at this stage), when he earned a commission as a second lieutenant into the United States Army's Infantry Branch.

Two years later in 1918, after the American entry into World War I, which occurred on April 6, 1917, Bolte shipped off for the Western Front to reinforce the American Expeditionary Force under General John J. Pershing. Serving as a company commander in the 58th Infantry Regiment, part of the 4th Division, he saw combat in the Battle of Saint-Mihiel and the Meuse-Argonne Offensive, where he was wounded in action on September 19.

Between the wars
Bolte returned to the United States as a captain in August 1919, nine months after the war came to an end on November 11, 1918 at 11:00am. He chose to remain in the army during the interwar period and completed the Infantry Advanced Course at Fort Benning, Georgia in 1930, graduated in 1932 from the United States Army Command and General Staff College, and was ordered to the American Barracks, Tientsin, China for duty with the 15th Infantry Regiment as S-3 company and battalion commander. In April 1936, back in the United States, Bolte was assigned to command a battalion of the 13th Infantry Regiment at Fort Devens, Massachusetts. The following August, he entered the United States Army War College, graduated in June 1937, and remained there as an instructor until 1940, during World War II, although the United States was not yet involved in the war. On August 18, 1940, he was promoted to lieutenant colonel.

World War II
In 1941, Bolte, by now a lieutenant colonel (having been promoted on December 24, 1941), journeyed to London as head of a group of army observers and, early in 1942, after the United States had entered World War II due to the Japanese attack on Pearl Harbor followed by the German declaration of war on the United States, assumed the position of chief of staff of U.S. Forces in the United Kingdom, with the one-star general officer rank of brigadier general. Promoted on April 26, 1943, to the two-star rank of major general, he returned to the United States in 1943 and raised and commanded the 69th Infantry Division in Mississippi.

In July 1944, upon the request of Lieutenant General Mark W. Clark, commanding the American Fifth Army on the Italian Front he was sent to Italy where he took over command of the 34th Infantry Division (nicknamed "The Red Bull"), an Army National Guard formation, then locked in fierce combat on the Arno River. He replaced Major General Charles W. Ryder, who had led the 34th Division for over two years. He led the 34th through several successful actions, including the rupture of the Gothic Line, the winter campaign in the Apennine Mountains, the breakthrough and the capture of the Italian city of Bologna in Operation Grapeshot (codename for the final offensive of the Italian Campaign), the surrender of the Axis forces in Italy on April 29, 1945, and the subsequent occupation of the Northwestern and then the Northeastern sectors of Italy. The end of World War II in Europe came soon afterwards.

Bolte earned two Army Distinguished Service Medals, the Silver Star, the Legion of Merit and the Purple Heart for his exploits during the war.

Postwar

Bolte served in Washington after the war and in 1953, at the three-star rank of lieutenant general, he became Commanding General (CG) of United States Army Europe. Later that year, Bolte returned home to serve as Vice Chief of Staff of the United States Army under General Matthew Bunker Ridgway who, like Bolte, had also had a distinguished war record. Bolte retired from active service in 1955 as a full general.

Following retirement, he worked as special assistant to the chairman of the board of American Car & Foundry Industries from 1955 to 1958. He then became Chairman of the Board of Advanced Growth Capital Corporation, retiring from this in the 1960s. He was also active in charitable work, and served as President of the Army & Navy Club. He died on February 11, 1989, at Mount Vernon Hospital, Virginia, after a stroke, and was buried in Arlington National Cemetery.

Dates of rank

References

External links
Charles Lawrence Bolte at ArlingtonCemetery.net, an unofficial website
Generals of World War II
United States Army Officers 1939–1945

|-

|-

|-

|-

Military personnel from Illinois
United States Army personnel of World War I
United States Army Infantry Branch personnel
Recipients of the Silver Star
Recipients of the Legion of Merit
Burials at Arlington National Cemetery
United States Army Vice Chiefs of Staff
Illinois Institute of Technology alumni
United States Army Command and General Staff College alumni
1895 births
1989 deaths
United States Army generals of World War II
United States Army generals
Recipients of the Distinguished Service Medal (US Army)